The Vivarium was a monastery, library, and biblical studies center founded c. 544 by Cassiodorus near Squillace, in Calabria, Italy. Cassiodorus also established a biblical studies center on the Bible and a library inside. It became a place of preservation for classical Greek and Latin literature.

The Vivarium was meant to build bridges across the cultural fault lines of the sixth century: those between Romans and Goths, between orthodox Catholics and their Arian rulers, between the east and west, between the Greek and the Latin worlds, and between pagans and Christians.

At the outbreak of the Graeco-Gothic War, Cassiodorus decided to retire from politics and left Italy for Constantinople, where he remained until at least 544.  During this time, he focused on the study of religious issues. The Constantinopolitan period contributed significantly to the deepening of his theological knowledge. Around 544, he returned to home, and founded the Vivarium near Scolacium, on the shore of the Ionian Sea. The exact date of its founding is uncertain.

In 540, the Roman Senator Cassiodorus retired from the public life within the monastery and ordered to the Benedictine monks to learn about medicinal herbs and to copy various medical texts, including works of Galen, Hippocrates and of the pharmacist Dioscorides.

After the death of Cassiodorus, the manuscripts housed here were dispersed, some making their way to the Lateran Palace.

References

Bibliography 
 Franco Cardini, Cassiodorus the Great. Rome, barbarians and monasticism, Milan, Jaca Book, 2009. 
 Luciana Cuppo Csaki, Contra voluntatem fundatorum: the monasterium Vivariense Cassiodorus after 575 in: ACTA XIII Congressus Internationalis Archaeologiae Christianae (Vatican City, Split 1998) vol. II, pp. 551-586. 
 Luciana Cuppo Csaki, The Monastery of Cassiodorus Vivariense: reconnaissance and research, 1994-1999, in: Frühes Rom und zwischen Christentum Konstantinopel, Akten des XIV. Internationalen Kongresses für Christliche Archäologie, Wien 19.-26. 9. 1999, Herausgegeben von R. Harreither, Ph. Pergola, R. Pillinger, A. Pulz (Wien, 2006) pp. 301-316. 
 Fabio Troncarelli, Vivarium. The books, the fate, Turnhout: Brepols, 1998.

Monasteries in Italy
544 establishments
Buildings and structures completed in the 6th century
6th-century establishments in Italy